The Gary Burnstein Community Health Clinic is a free clinic in Pontiac, Michigan, United States. It provides primary free medical health and dental services to low-income and uninsured individuals. The Burnstein free clinic faces strong demand due to high unemployment in Michigan.

History

In 1997, Dr. Gary Burnstein, a cardiologist, started caring for patients from a local shelter in Pontiac, Michigan.  Dr. Burnstein died in September 2003.  His family took up his goal of providing healthcare access to the uninsured and founded the Dr. Gary Burnstein Community Health Clinic in October 2004.

90 West University building
Volunteers from the Kensington Community Church renovated a building into an operating medical clinic, dental clinic , and pharmacy from January 2004 through October 2004. The clinic opened in October 2004. In 2005, a fire at the clinic forced the clinic to move temporarily to the Grace Centers of Hope church.

The clinic reopened in December 2005. The volunteer medical team saw about 150 to 200 patients and filled 300 to 400 prescriptions per month. The clinic had four examination rooms, a procedure room, two dental examination rooms with X-ray capabilities, and a pharmacy laboratory.

45580 Woodward Avenue building
In 2013 the Robert S. Peterson Foundation purchased a new building for the clinic. After a little over a year of fundraising and design, construction began on the new facility in October 2014, and the clinic moved into its new space in February 2015.  The new building has seven medical exam rooms, five dental operating rooms, a full-service pharmacy, and an educational room.  The Clinic offers various specialty services, including podiatry, dermatology, cardiology, optometry, gynecology, etc.  All services are free to uninsured, low-income adults.  COVID vaccines are available for ages five and older.

Services
All of the following services are provided free to qualifying patients:

 Basic primary care
 Patient education
 Disease prevention and screening
 Women's health, including gynecological care
 Men's health
 Laboratory testing
 Gynecological care
 Full pharmacy services
 Basic Behavioral Health services

Patient requirements
 Supply the clinic with the most recent financial information
 Supply the clinic with valid picture identification
 Be a resident of the State of Michigan.
 Fall within the clinic's income guidelines (250% of the federal poverty level)
 Be uninsured

Fundraising
The financial support of the Clinic is based almost entirely on community donations, corporate and charitable grants, public grants, private donations, and the annual Esteemed Women of Michigan event.

Events
 Esteemed Women of Michigan

References

External links
 Gary Burnstein Community Health Clinic
 Burnstein Clinic YouTube Channel
 Free Health Clinics of Michigan

Clinics in the United States
Buildings and structures in Pontiac, Michigan
Medical and health organizations based in Michigan